Álvaro Lafuente Calvo (born 27 August 1997), better known by his stage name Guitarricadelafuente is a Spanish singer-songwriter, guitarist and musician based in Zaragoza. Lafuente started posting covers on different social media platforms like Instagram in 2017 while being unsigned. Those covers attracted a modest number of people at first thanks to their mix of indie folk, rumba, and flamenco music. In April 2018 he released his first original song titled "El Conticinio" which he recorded at home with a PlayStation microphone. Lafuente continued posting original songs and started a little tour through selected cities in Spain. In June 2019 he collaborated with Operación Triunfo contestant and fellow friend Natalia Lacunza on her debut single "Nana Triste" which peaked at number 4 on the PROMUSICAE chart. After the single's critical and commercial success, Lafuente continued releasing singles independently.

Biography 
Guitarricadelafuente was born Álvaro Lafuente Calvo in August 1997 in Benicàssim, a small tourist-orientated village in the coast of the province of Castellón. During his teenage years he spent a lot of time in Las Cuevas de Cañart, a 70-inhabitant rural town in the hills of the Sierra de Albarracín, where his grandmother lives. He received his first acoustic guitar on his fifteenth birthday and taught himself how to play it. In 2017 he started posting covers of different Spanish-language songs in his respective social media profiles. That same year he started composing original songs with "El Conticinio" being the first one to be released on streaming platforms. He was contacted by the team of television talent competition La Voz through his Instagram messages to audition for the contest although he was never selected after accepting the opportunity. He also tried to participate in series nine of talent show Operación Triunfo which came back to television after a 6-year hiatus. The singer is now based in Zaragoza.

Career

2017–2018: Beginnings 
Lafuente first started posting covers of different songs on YouTube and Instagram in 2017. His mix of modern and antique musical arts attracted multiple people. He was asked by the team of La Voz to audition for the television contest but didn't make it to the show. In December 2017 he played his first official concert at La Rockeria, a small musical bar in Valencia. Throughout 2018 he continued posting covers and original songs on different streaming platforms, played a couple concerts in the Valencian Community and Madrid and collaborated with Balcony TV, a Catalan a web platform that serves as a showcase for emerging artists which has also collaborated with artists like C. Tangana, Eurovision performer Alfred García or global pop phenomenon Rosalía back in the day. In October 2018 he posted four songs on Spotify, "Guantanamera", "Sixtinain", the previously released "El Conticinio" and a cover of Manuel Vallejo's 1926 track "Catalina" and continued promoting them in local radios and free performances in local parks. He left university after changing his professional career three times (first architecture, then cinema and then a degree in design) to focus on his music.

2019–present: Breakthrough and La Cantera 
In January 2019 he sang the main song for the movie "Nada Será Igual" and started a small tour which he named "La Girica" a month later. The tour visited selected musical bars in a couple of cities. On 5 June he posted on YouTube the music video for "Guantanamera" directed by Pedro Artola, being this his first one. That same month he performed two sold-out shows at Galileo Galilei, a 500-capacity musical venue in the centre of Madrid. He also opened the show for Diego el Cigala at the Jardins de Pedralbes festival in Barcelona and performed for the first time on television in the musical segment of La 2 evening newscast. That same day, 14 June, his collaboration with fellow friend Natalia Lacunza was released for digital download through Universal Music. Lacunza had participated on the tenth edition of the Spanish televised musical contest Operación Triunfo which had an average audience of two million people. Thus, her first single, "Nana Triste", which features Guitarricadelafuente, became a must-listen song in Spain thanks to its high expectancy. The music video for "Nana Triste" was visualized more than a million times in its first 24 hours and peaked at number four on the PROMUSICAE chart, the organisation responsible for the Spanish Albums Chart. The song charted for 18 consecutive weeks, leaving the chart in December 2019. Thanks to the success of the collaboration, his song "Guantanamera" peaked at number 69 and spent 3 weeks on the chart. Lafuente became extremely popular and performed in several national festivals through the year in Valladolid and Galicia. He also expanded his tour and performed sold-out concerts in Castellón, Málaga, Granada, Murcia and Barcelona between others, all of them being sold-out. On 17 August 2019 he performed a whole concert at Las Cuevas de Cañart's old monastery ruins which, following his words, has been his most emotional and special concert to date.

The singer collaborated with Muerdo on his album "Fin de la Primera Vida", which was released in January 2020. He also covered "Cerrado Por Derribo" alongside Niño de Elche for Joaquin Sabina's tribute album "Ni Tan Joven Ni Tan Viejo" which was a best-selling album that topped the album charts for several weeks. In 2020 he extended his national tour and scheduled two concerts in Mexico which had to be postponed due to the 2019–20 coronavirus pandemic. Other shows in theatres in Spain were cancelled or rescheduled. That same year he was also nominated for three MIN awards for "Best New Artist", "Best Music Video" for "Guantanamera" and "Song of the Year" for "Agua Y Mezcal". This awards congratulate independent music performers. In January 2020 he collaborated with Mexican musician Silvana Estrada on the acoustic remix of "Guantanamera".

Recording sessions for his debut album (then planned as an EP) began in October 2019. On 3 April 2020 he released "Desde las Alturas" which has been confirmed to be the first single of the album, which is scheduled to be released in late 2020 although the recording sessions have been stopped due to the ongoing pandemic. The album is being produced by Raúl Lamina and Refree, who has worked with Rosalía and Amaia between others. The release of the songs ends his droplet no-radio impact era where he released "Nacido Pa Ganar", "Agua Y Mezcal" and "ABC" in June and September 2019 respectively.

Artistry 
Lafuente has been cited as "an old soul based in the hills of Aragón with Andalusian air and with a Valencian heart; an old soul, that has no other explanation for a sensitivity typical of the greats of Spanish-Latin music". The singer describes his music as "real music, with truth and without any arrangement or production; with clear and concise messages that I didn't realise could touch the hearts of this many people" he states that "there is no songwriting process in my songs, they occur to me on the go".

The singer has cited urban artists like Nathy Peluso or Bad Gyal as major influences for his songs. He gets inspired by their persona other than their musical genre. He has also stated that he has listened a lot to Loquillo and Extremoduro while growing up but doesn't think that it will influence his music. He has also cited South American culture as a major influence by saying "I like all the Southern American imaginary, it is a very rich and colorful culture. Very nice to tell. With many stories, it transmits a lot".

Discography 
Albums

 La Cantera (2022)

Singles

 "El Conticinio" (2018)
 "Guantanamera" (2018)
 "Sixtinain" (2018)
 "Nacido Pa Ganar" (2019)
 "Agua Y Mezcal" (2019)
 "ABC" (2019)
 "Desde Las Alturas" (2020)
 "Ya mi mama me decía" (2020)
 "Mil y una noches" (2021)
 "Vidalita del mar" (2022)
 "Quién encendió la luz" (2022)

Collaborations

 "Nana Triste" (with Natalia Lacunza) (2019)
 "Vas a Encontrarte" (with Muerdo) (2019)
 "Cerrado Por Derribo" (with Niño de Elche) (2019)
 "Góndolas" (with Nostalgia.en.los.autobouses and Raül Refree) (2020)
 "Límite" (with Feten Feten) (2020)

Tours 
Headlining

 La Girica (2019–20)

References 

21st-century Spanish singers
Singers from the Valencian Community
Living people
Spanish pop singers
1997 births